Tourtellotte Memorial High School is located in North Grosvenordale, Connecticut, a tiny village within the town of Thompson, Connecticut.

References

External links
 

Schools in Windham County, Connecticut
Public high schools in Connecticut
Thompson, Connecticut